The St Kitts & Nevis Cycling Federation is based on the island of Nevis, and is responsible for the development of cycling in the federation of Saint Kitts and Nevis, and for the athletes involved in the sport. Recognised by the  world governing body the UCI, the St Kitts & Nevis Cycling Federation is one of the youngest in the Caribbean region.

External links
 Nevis Cycle & Triathlon Club. Last updated 2017.

Cycle racing organizations
Cycling
Cycle racing in Saint Kitts and Nevis